Venetian red is a light and warm (somewhat unsaturated) pigment that is a darker shade of red, derived from nearly pure ferric oxide (Fe2O3) of the hematite type. Modern versions are frequently made with synthetic red iron oxide.

Historically, Venetian red was a red earth color often used in Italian Renaissance paintings. It was also called sinopia because the best-quality pigment came from the port of Sinop in northern Turkey. It was the major ingredient in the pigment called , described by the 15th-century Italian painter and writer Cennino Cennini in his handbook on painting, Il libro dell'arte. Cennini recommended mixing Venetian red with lime white, in proportions of two to one, to paint the skin tones of faces, hands and nudes.

During the English Civil War (1642–1651), Venetian red was adopted as the primary uniform colour of the New Model Army, to ease mutual identification on the battlefield. In addition, Venetian red was cheaper than other dyes at the time. Following the war, this practice was continued by the British Army, giving its soldiers the nickname "Redcoats", during the 18th and 19th centuries. Venetian red was replaced as the main colour of British Army battledress by khaki, during the 1890s.

The first recorded use of Venetian red as a color name in English was in 1753.

References

Shades of red
Iron oxide pigments